Jón Erling Ragnarsson (born 18 May 1964) is a retired Icelandic football striker.

References

1964 births
Living people
Jon Erling Ragnarsson
Jon Erling Ragnarsson
Viking FK players
Jon Erling Ragnarsson
Association football forwards
Jon Erling Ragnarsson
Expatriate footballers in Norway
Jon Erling Ragnarsson
Eliteserien players